Bald River Gorge Wilderness is a  wilderness area of Cherokee National Forest that lies within Monroe County in the U.S. state of Tennessee, designated in 1984. It is administered by the United States Forest Service.

References

IUCN Category Ib
Wilderness areas of Tennessee
Wilderness areas of the Appalachians
Protected areas of Monroe County, Tennessee
1984 establishments in Tennessee
Protected areas established in 1984